Claudine West (1890–1943) was a British novelist and screenwriter who was a three-time Academy Award nominee. She moved to Hollywood in 1929, and was employed by MGM on many films, including some of their biggest productions of the late 1930s and early 1940s. 

She frequently wrote scripts in European settings, including British-themed films Goodbye, Mr. Chips (nominated for an Academy Award) and The White Cliffs of Dover.

In 1942, West won an Oscar for her work on World War II drama Mrs. Miniver.

Personal life 
West was born on January 16, 1884 in Nottingham, England.

West died in Beverly Hills, California on April 12, 1943 after "a long illness."

Selected filmography
 The Last of Mrs. Cheyney (1929)
 The High Road (1930)
 The Guardsman (1931)
 Son of India (1931)
 Jenny Lind (1932)
 Payment Deferred (1932)
 Reunion in Vienna (1933)
 The Barretts of Wimpole Street (1934)
 The Dark Angel (1935)
 The Good Earth (1937)
 Marie Antoinette (1938)
 Goodbye, Mr. Chips (1939) – Nominated for the Academy Award for Best Adapted Screenplay
 The Mortal Storm (1940)
 Random Harvest (1942) - Academy Award nominee
 Mrs. Miniver (1942) – Won the Academy Award for Best Adapted Screenplay
 The White Cliffs of Dover (1944)

References

Bibliography
 Calder, Robert L. Beware the British Serpent: The Role of Writers in British Propaganda in the United States, 1939-1945. McGill-Queen's Press, 2004.

External links

1890 births
1943 deaths
British emigrants to the United States
People from Nottingham
20th-century British novelists
Best Adapted Screenplay Academy Award winners
20th-century British screenwriters